Eparchy of Raška and Prizren is one of the oldest eparchies of the Serbian Orthodox Church, featuring the seat of the Serbian Orthodox Church, the Serbian Patriarchal Monastery of Peć, as well as Serbian Orthodox Monastery of Visoki Dečani, which together are part of the UNESCO World Heritage sites of Serbia. More than 100 of the Eparchy's churches and monasteries were targeted for vandalism and destruction by Albanian nationalists after the Kosovo War and during the 2004 unrest in Kosovo.

Jurisdiction of the Eparchy is reflected in its name: it has diocesan jurisdiction over Eastern Orthodox Christians in historical regions of Raška (Serbia) and Kosovo and Metohija. The official see of the Eparchy is in Prizren, Kosovo.

History

Under the jurisdiction of Archbishopric of Justiniana Prima
Within the territory of the present-day Eparchy of Raška and Prizren several older eparchies existed throughout history. One of them was the ancient Bishopric of Ulpiana also known as Iustiniana Secunda situated near the modern town of Lipljan, where the remains of episcopal Basilica dating from the first half of 6th century have been found and excavated. Originally, the episcopal see of Ulpiana was under the supreme jurisdiction of the Archbishopric of Thessaloniki, and in 535 it was transferred to newly created Archbishopric of Justiniana Prima. Byzantine rule in that region collapsed at the beginning of the 7th century and the church life was later renewed after a more pronounced Christianization of Serbs.

Episcopal sees in Serbian lands
The Bishopric of Ras was named after the old Serbian fortress of Ras that was situated near modern-day Novi Pazar. From the name of Ras the name of entire region was also derived (ser. Рашка (Raška), lat. Rascia). The Bishopric of Ras emerged sometime during the 9th century, in the time that was marked by great missionary work of saints Cyril and Methodius and their disciples among Slavs, from Great Moravia in the north to Bulgaria in the east. During the rule of the prince Mutimir of Serbia and Byzantine emperor Basil I (867–886) process of Christianization of Serbs was finalized. One of Mutimirs sons was baptized as Stefan (Stefan Mutimirović) and other members of the ruling Serbian dynasty also received Christian names like princes Petar Gojniković, Pavle Branović and Zaharija Pribislavljević.

Serbian bishopric of Ras was founded in the time of major ecclesiastical events that took place around the Council of Constantinople in 869–870 and the Council of Constantinople in 879–880. Two land-marking decisions have been made in that time. First, the decision of the Patriarchate of Constantinople to create autonomous Archbishopric for Bulgaria after the Conversion of Bulgarians to Christianity and second, the decision of 870 that confirmed the attachment of Bulgarian Church to Eastern Orthodoxy. By 878, episcopal sees in nearby cities of Belgrade and Braničevo have already been firmly established. It can be concluded that the Bishopric of Ras was also founded by that time. Close ties between Serbia and Byzantine Empire secured the communion of Serbian Church with the Eastern Orthodoxy and its main center in Constantinople, with one important distinction: Serbs adopted the use of Old Church Slavonic liturgy instead of Greek.

In the time of emperor John I Tzimiskes (969–976), Byzantine rule was restored in the region and protospatharios John was appointed as governor (catepan) of Ras.

Under the jurisdiction of Archbishopric of Ohrid

After the victorious Byzantine conquest of Bulgaria in 1018, by order of emperor Basil II an autonomous Bulgarian Archbishopric of Ohrid was established in 1019, by lowering the rank of the autocephalous Bulgarian Patriarchate due to its subjugation to Constantinople, placing it under the supreme ecclesiastical jurisdiction the Patriarchate of Constantinople. Imperial charters of 1019 and 1020 mention three bishoprics on the territory of present-day Eparchy of Raška and Prizren with episcopal seats in the cities of Ras, Prizren and Lipljan. All three were designated as distinct dioceses of the autonomous Archbishopric of Ohrid. Until the beginning of the 13th century, archbishops of Ochrid were regarded as Archbishopric of Justiniana Prima and all Bulgaria.

Under the jurisdiction of Serbian Orthodox Church
The autocephaly of Serbian Orthodox Church was established in 1219 by Saint Sava, who was consecrated as first Serbian archbishop by the Byzantine patriarch residing at that time in Nicaea. Since then, all of the three old bishoprics of Raška, Prizren and Lipljan were under the constant jurisdiction of Archbishop of Serbia. New Bishopric of Hvosno was also created in northern parts of the region of Metohija. The see of Serbian archbishop was soon transferred from Monastery of Žiča to Peć in Metohija.

In 1346, Serbian Archbishopric was raised to the rank of Patriarchate with its see remaining in Peć. At the same time the bishoprics of Prizren and Lipljan were raised by title to the rank of metropolitanates. Bishops of Lipljan kept under their jurisdiction the region of central Kosovo with Gračanica and Novo Brdo. Period from the beginning of 13 century to the end of 14 century was the golden age for Orthodox Church in the regions of Raška, Kosovo and Metohija with many monasteries and churches built by Serbian rulers and local Serbian nobility.

In the time of Turkish conquests, in the middle of the 15th century, Serbian Orthodox Church suffered great devastation. Regions of Raška, Kosovo and Metohija finally fell under Turkish rule around 1455. Serbian Patriarchate was renewed in 1557 by patriarch Makarije Sokolović. In that time (16th–17th century) on the territory of modern Eparchy there were: Patriarchal see in Peć and five eparchies: Raška, Prizren, Lipljan, Vučitrn and Hvosno. of All of the regional sees in Raška, Kosovo and Metohija remained under constant jurisdiction of Serbian Patriarchate until its abolition in 1766.

During that time, two major events tragically impacted Orthodox Church in the region. In the time of Austro-Turkish war (1683–1699) relations between Muslims and Christians in European provinces of Ottoman Empire were radicalized. As a result of Turkish oppression, destruction of Churches and Monasteries and violence against non-Muslim civilian population, Serbian Christians and their church leaders headed by Serbian Patriarch Arsenije III sided with Austrians in 1689 and again in 1737 under Serbian Patriarch Arsenije IV. In the following punitive campaigns, Turkish forces conducted systematic atrocities against Christian population in Serbian regions, mainly in Metohija, Kosovo and Raška, resulting in Great Migrations of the Serbs.

One of the consequences of devastation and depopulation in the regions of Kosovo and Metohija during Austro-Turkish wars was the reorganization of local Serbian eparchies. The old Eparchy of Lipljan (with Gračanica and Novo Brdo) was merged with the Eparchy of Prizren and they remained united to the present day.

Modern history

In 1766, Serbian Patriarchate of Peć and all of its eparchies that were on territories under Ottoman rule were placed under the jurisdiction of the Ecumenical Patriarchate of Constantinople. That included both eparchies of Raška and Prizren. During the transfer of jurisdictions, Serbian patriarchal archeparchy of Peć was abolished, and its territory was added to the Eparchy of Prizren. In 1789, that eparchy was placed under administration of metropolitan Joanikije of Raška. In 1808, the eparchies of Raška and Prizren were officially merged into the current Eparchy of Raška and Prizren. In 1894, the region of Pljevlja was also added to this eparchy. Turkish rule ended in 1912, and territory of eparchy was divided between Kingdom of Serbia and Kingdom of Montenegro. Prizren became part of the Kingdom of Serbia, and Peja became part of the Kingdom of Montenegro. Political division was followed by reorganization of church administration. In the Montenegrin part, a separated Eparchy of Peć was created. During the First World War (1914-1918) territories of both eparchies were occupied by the army of Austria-Hungary. After the re-annexation in 1918, new Kingdom of Yugoslavia was created, and included all territories of Serbia and Montenegro. After the Serbian Patriarchate was renewed in 1920, Eparchy of Raška and Prizren was returned to the jurisdiction of the Serbian Orthodox Church. In 1931, Eparchy of Peć was reincorporated into the Eparchy of Raška and Prizren. In 1941, Yugoslavia was attacked and occupied by Nazi Germany and its allies. The territory of the Eparchy of Raška and Prizren was occupied by Germans (northern part), Italians (central part) and Bulgarians (eastern part). The Italian occupation zone was annexed to the Italian protectorate of Albania. That marked the beginning of mass persecution of ethnic Serbs in the annexed regions of Metohija and central Kosovo. Many Serbian churches of the Eparchy of Raška and Prizren were looted and destroyed. Reign of terror was enforced by Albanian fascist organization Balli Kombëtar and by Albanian SS Division "Skanderbeg", created by Heinrich Himmler. By the time of the re-annexation in 1944, the Serbian population, of which most were colonizers after the 1st Balkan War, were expelled from Kosovo.

Church buildings

Church of Saint Apostles Peter and Paul in Ras

The Church of Peter and Paul in Ras is one of the most important Serbian Christian monuments from the Middle Age period of Serbia. The church was declared a Monument of Culture of Exceptional Importance in 1979, and it is protected by Serbia. The church served as a seat of the Bishopric of Ras, named after near by medieval capital of Serbia. The present church (9th–10th century) has been built on several earlier churches of which remains have been well preserved. The foundation of the church, the massive columns, ground-plan and the octagonal tower which conceals an inner cupola are examples of the circular mausolean architectural type used after Emperor Constantine (306–312). Saint Sava (1175–1235), a Serbian prince, brother of the Serbian king Stefan Prvovenčani and the founder of the Serbian Orthodox Church was baptized in the church. Stefan Nemanja held the council that outlawed the Bogumils at the church. The remains of frescoes date from the 10th to the 13th century; some of them were repainted in the mid-13th century.

Church of the Holy Apostles Peter and Paul, Suva Reka
Church of the Holy Apostles Peter and Paul, Suva Reka

Monasteries

Bishops and Metropolitans

Notes

See more
 Destruction of Serbian heritage in Kosovo

References

Sources

 
 
 
 
 
 
 
 
 
 
 
 
 
 
 
 
 
 
 
 
 
 
 
 
 
 
 
 
 
 
 
 
 
 
 
 
 
 
 
 
 
 
 
 See Corridors

Further reading
Crucified Kosovo: Destroyed and desecrated Serbian Orthodox churches in Kosovo and Metohia (June–October 1999)
Jovanka Kalić, Rascia – The Nucleus of the Medieval Serbian State
Sima Ćirković, Rises and falls in Serbian statehood in the Middle Ages
Đorđe Janković, Kosovo And Metohia In The Middle Ages – Archaeological Research
Radoš Ljušić, The centuries under Turkish rule and the revival of Serbian statehood
Milovan Radovanović Kosovo and Metohia – A Geographical and Ethnocultural Entity in the Republic of Serbia
Dušan Bataković, The Kosovo Chronicles
Old Serbia and Albanians

External links
 Official site of the Eparchy of Raška and Prizren
 Official site of the Serbian Orthodox Church 
 List of Cultural Monuments in Serbia 
 Project Rastko: Kosovo and Metohija
 Monasteries of the Eparchy of Raška and Prizren
 Kosovo.net Serbian Orthodox Church in Kosovo and Metohia
 Теодосије нови епископ рашко-призренски („Политика“, 18. новембар 2010)
 Устоличење новоизабраног Епископа рашко-призренског Теодосија – Призрен,, 26. децембар 2010.

Religious sees of the Serbian Orthodox Church
Serbian Orthodox Church in Serbia
Serbian Orthodox Church in Kosovo
Dioceses established in the 13th century
Religious organizations established in the 1210s
1219 establishments in Europe